The Diocese of the East, also called the Diocese of Oriens, was a diocese of the later Roman Empire, incorporating the provinces of the western Middle East, between the Mediterranean Sea and Mesopotamia. During late Antiquity, it was one of the major commercial, agricultural, religious and intellectual areas of the empire, and its strategic location facing the Sassanid Empire and the unruly desert tribes gave it exceptional military importance.

History
The capital of the diocese was at Antioch, and its governor had the special title of comes Orientis ("Count of the East", of the rank vir spectabilis and later vir gloriosus) instead of the ordinary "vicarius". The diocese was established after the reforms of Diocletian (r. 284–305), and was subordinate to the praetorian prefecture of the East.

The diocese included originally all Middle Eastern provinces of the Empire: Isauria, Cilicia, Cyprus, Euphratensis, Mesopotamia, Osroene, Syria Coele, Phoenice, Palaestina Prima, Palaestina Secunda, Arabia, and the Egyptian provinces Aegyptus, Augustamnica, Thebais, Libya Superior and Libya Inferior, which were grouped into the separate Diocese of Egypt under Valens (r. 364–378). During the course of the 4th century, several provinces were split, resulting in the new provinces of Cilicia I and Cilicia II, Syria I and Syria II Salutaris, Phoenice I and Phoenice II Libanensis (east of Mt. Lebanon), Palaestina I, Palaestina II and Palaestina Salutaris (or Palaestina III). The last creation of a new province dated in the reign of Justinian I (r. 527–565), when Theodorias, the region around Laodicea, was split off from Syria I. At about the same time, Cyprus was split off and became part of a new super-province, the quaestura exercitus.

In 535, as part of his administrative reforms, Justinian I abolished the diocese, and the comes Orientis became the provincial governor of Syria I, while retaining his previous rank of vir spectabilis and his salary.

The entire area of the former diocese came under Sassanid Persian occupation in the 610s and 620s, during the Byzantine–Sassanid War of 602–628. Shortly after the Byzantine victory in the war and the recovery of the region, it was again lost, this time permanently, to the Muslim conquests: by the 640s, Cilicia formed the border between Byzantium and the new Arab Caliphate, while Cyprus became a disputed territory. From the old provinces of the Diocese of the East, only Isauria and parts of the two Cilicias remained under Byzantine rule, grouped under the new Anatolic Theme.

List of Comites Orientis 

 Quintus Flavius Maesius Egnatius Lollianus (330–336)
 Felicianus (335–?)
 Nebridius (354–358)
 Domitius Modestus (358–362)
 Iulianus (362–363)
 Aradius Rufinus (363–364)
 Eutolmius Tatianus (c. 370)
 Tuscianus (381)
 Philagrius (382)
 Proculus (383–384)
 Icarius (c. 384)
 Irenaeus (431–435)
 Ephraim of Amida (c. 522–c. 525)
 Asterius (587–588)
 Bacchus (588–589)
 Bonosus (c. 609–610)

References 

East
East
Late Roman Syria
Byzantine Syria
Praetorian prefecture of the East
314 establishments
States and territories established in the 310s
535 disestablishments
States and territories disestablished in the 530s